Helena Martha Brunner, OAM, (born 1957 or 1958) is an Australian swimmer, who won seven medals at the 1984 New York/Stoke Mandeville Games.

Personal
As a teenager, Brunner represented her state of New South Wales in national able-bodied swimming competitions, but she quit swimming at the age of seventeen; she was then briefly interested in water polo. After finishing school, she attended Goulburn College of Advanced Education.

In 1978 at the age of 20, she had a severe motorcycle accident while delivering mail for Australia Post; as a result, her right leg was amputated below the knee two years later. During her rehabilitation, she met someone who suggested that she take up swimming again.

Eighteen months after the 1984 Paralympics, she had a daughter. She also worked as a teacher.

Swimming career
At the 1984 New York/Stoke Mandeville Paralympics, Brunner won five gold medals in the Women's 100 m Backstroke A4, Women's 100 m Freestyle A4, Women's 400 m Freestyle A4, Women's 4x100 m Freestyle Relay A1–A9, and Women's 4x100 m Individual Medley Relay A1–A9 events, a silver medal in the Women's 200 m Individual Medley A4 event, and a bronze medal in the Women's 100 m Breaststroke A4 event. She broke five world records at the 1984 games and fourteen throughout her career. Some of them still stand; however, the classification system for swimming has since been changed.

Recognition
In 1985, Brunner received a Medal of the Order of Australia "in recognition of service to the sport of swimming". She presented the floral tributes to medallists in the amputee swimming events at the 2000 Sydney Paralympics.

References

Female Paralympic swimmers of Australia
Swimmers at the 1984 Summer Paralympics
Medalists at the 1984 Summer Paralympics
Paralympic gold medalists for Australia
Paralympic silver medalists for Australia
Paralympic bronze medalists for Australia
Paralympic medalists in swimming
Amputee category Paralympic competitors
Recipients of the Medal of the Order of Australia
Australian amputees
Sportswomen from New South Wales
Australian female freestyle swimmers
Australian female backstroke swimmers
Australian female medley swimmers
Australian female breaststroke swimmers
20th-century Australian women
1950s births
Living people